Glenealy is one of the few roads or streets without a suffix in Hong Kong. Located in the Mid-Levels on the Hong Kong Island, Hong Kong, it starts from Ice House Street and goes uphill to Hong Kong Zoological and Botanical Gardens, across Robinson Road and ends at Hornsey Road and Conduit Road.

Name
Glenealy was the short form of a valley called Glenealy Ravine. The valley separates the Government Hill in the east and Pedder's Hill in the west.

Alternatively, the valley was known as Elliot's Vale, after Charles Elliot, at the beginning and a road from Robinson Road leading to the house named Glenealy on the site of present Roman Catholic Cathedral is known as Elliot Crescent.

Vale in Elliot's Vale means river valley and a river runs from Victoria Peak down to Central. The Elliot Vale name seems, however, to have been as short-lived as Elliot's administration. The name Glenealy was quickly restored after Elliott's administration ended, with a new suffix of "ravine", a fitting name in view of its steepness.

Features
Glenealy was also the name of a mansion in the Victorian era. It belonged to an American opium trader, Warren Delano Jr., grandfather of Franklin Delano Roosevelt, the 32nd President of the United States of America. The mansion later gave way to the Catholic Cathedral of Hong Kong, whose construction commenced in 1883. The present address of the cathedral is 16 Caine Road.

Another Glenealy landmark is the 100-year-old Anglican Sheng Kung Hui , whose gates actually open to Wyndham Street. St. Paul's College was founded here too, in 1851, as a school for boys. It was closed in 1941 due to the Japanese invasion of Hong Kong. After the war it was briefly amalgamated with St. Paul's Girls' School to become St. Paul's Co-educational College, and a new campus was built away from Glenealy on Bonham Road when it resumed as its own institution.

It is one of the steepest roads in Hong Kong with public transport. It has a gradient of 1:5 in the Robinson Road to Conduit Road section, with Route 2*, 3, 3A and 45A (minibus) passing this road, which is often congested. The other 1:5 roads used by public transport in Hong Kong are Aberdeen Reservoir Road, Breezy Path and Castle Road.

The present Glenealy "street" is very short, running from number 1 to 10 only. The nearest point to reach Glenealy 1 is to walk uphill from the Hong Kong Fringe Club, while the nearest point to reach Glenealy 10 is to walk downhill from Caine Road near the Caritas House, through the very short pedestrian subway.

A total of 3 Glenealy street signs can be found - one is tucked away at the far end at the bottom of the hill where it can hardly be seen, one is hoisted at Sheng Kung Hui St Paul's Church near the Hong Kong Fringe Club yet no street number is mentioned. The 3rd sign, hoisted at the top of the Caritas House, is the only street sign showing the street number.

External links

A section about Glenealy 
Map: Glenealy, Hong Kong

Valleys of Hong Kong
Central, Hong Kong
Government Hill
Roads on Hong Kong Island